Peter Ochieng Odoyo (born 23 November 1959) is a Kenyan politician and economist. He was elected to represent the Nyakach Constituency in the National Assembly of Kenya from 1997 until 2007.  He served as Vice Chair on the Finance, Trade and Planning Committee from 1998 until 2001.  From 2001 until 2005, Odoyo held positions as Assistant Minister Foreign Affairs, Assistant Minister for Labour and Assistant Minister for Regional Development. He has been a member of the world e-parliament and was for many years their coordinator in Kenya and East Africa.

He has written and published many articles on management, leadership, diplomacy and economics in local and international papers and magazines. He was a senior consultant with Price Waterhouse Consultants and has also worked with the USAID Mission in Kenya (USAID Kenya 1987) and with the UNICEF East and Southern Region Offices as an economic consultant.

He is currently managing an advertising company based in Nairobi, Kenya, called Spellman and Walker.

Odoyo was awarded a BSc first class in Economics from the University of Wales and he also obtained an MBA with distinction from the University of Bradford.
 On January 14, 2020, he was appointed by H.E. President Uhuru Kenyatta as the Chief Administrative Secretary (CAS) for the Ministry of Defense, Kenya. He effectively became the second in Command after the Cabinet Secretary for Defence.(ref State House Nairobi Kenya and MOD Kenya website).

References

Living people
Alumni of the University of Wales
Alumni of the University of Bradford
1959 births
Members of the National Assembly (Kenya)